The 1998 Memphis Tigers football team represented the University of Memphis in the 1998 NCAA Division I-A football season. Memphis competed as a member of the Conference USA.  The team was led by head coach Rip Scherer, who was fired at the conclusion of the season.  The Tigers played their home games at the Liberty Bowl Memorial Stadium.

Schedule

References

Memphis
Memphis Tigers football seasons
Memphis Tigers football